Allain Tikko (1979 in Kõpu, Viljandimaa – 15 June 2009) was an Estonian warrant officer (veebel) in charge of a jagu (a small military unit) in ESTCOY-8, which had been posted in Afghanistan as a part of United Kingdom's military operations, itself a part of NATO continuing operations in Afghanistan.

Service 
Vbl Tikko began military service in 1998 in Battle School of EDF (Kaitseväe Lahingukool) and has served in the Scoutspataljon, the staff of the Maavägi (Ground Forces) and the operative department of the Head Staff of Kaitsevägi (the Estonian Defence Forces).  Before ESTCOY-8's mission in Afghanistan, Tikko had participated in three foreign missions: he had headed a section in Kosovo in 2003 as a part of the Baltic Reconnaissance Squadron (BALTSQN) for KFOR; he had headed an infantry section of ESTPLA-9 in Iraq in 2004, and he had served in Afghanistan in 2007 in ESTCOY-4.

Awards 

Death 
On early morning of 15 June 2009, vbl Tikko's squad was ambushed in about one kilometre from the Pimon patrol base in the Helmand province.

Background 
Estonia has been participating in NATO operations in Afghanistan since 2003. Before vbl Tikko, three Estonian soldiers had died in the course of these operations.

After the scheduled five-month increase of military presence in July, intended to improve security during the upcoming presidential elections of Afghanistan, Estonian military contingent will be the second largest (after the United States) of the participating NATO forces.

References 

1979 births
2009 deaths
People from Põhja-Sakala Parish
Estonian military personnel killed in action
Estonian military personnel killed in the War in Afghanistan (2001–2021)